Diebold Schilling the Younger (before 1460 - 3 November 1515(?)) was the author of the "Luzerner Schilling", one of the Swiss illustrated chronicles, which he presented to the city council of Lucerne on 15 January 1513 (but which remained incomplete). He was the nephew of Diebold Schilling the Elder of Bern. The younger Diebold was a somewhat scandalous figure, not unlike his father Hans, brother to the elder Diebold, an adventurer who had  sought his fortune at the court of Matthias Corvinus, and returned destitute in 1488. Diebold was a secretary in Lucerne from 1479, and received the priesthood in 1481. His behaviour was so unpriestly, however, that the city council locked him into the tower in 1487, where he remained imprisoned for two years before he was released on parole of exhibiting more appropriate behaviour in the future. After his release he was soon back to his old ways, and after he had killed a man after a tavern brawl, he was fined and obliged to read a mass for his victim every year. Diebold was fiercely anti-French, and he accused the Bernese in particular, as well as his fellow chronicler Petermann Etterlin because of their friendly attitude towards France. Diebold's own sympathies lay with the German emperor Maximilian I, who personally invited him to the Reichstag in Konstanz in 1507. As an author, Diebold's most important contribution to the historiography of his times is his account of the years 1507–1509, the events of which he tells in his own words as an eye-witness.

References

External links
Lucerne chronicle facsimile

Swiss chroniclers
1515 deaths
15th-century Swiss historians
16th-century Swiss historians
Year of birth unknown
People from Lucerne